Sakuranetin is a flavan-on, the 7-methoxy derivative of naringenin, found in Polymnia fruticosa and rice, where it acts as a phytoalexin against spore germination of Pyricularia oryzae.


Glycosides 
Sakuranin is the 5-O-glucoside of sakuranetin.

Metabolism 
 biosynthesis
Naringenin 7-O-methyltransferase uses naringenin to yield sakuranetin, with S-adenosyl-methionine as the methyl donor.

 biodegradation
In compounds like 7-methoxylated flavanones like sakuranetin, demethylation followed by sulfation occur in model organism Cunninghamella elegans.

References 

Aromatase inhibitors
O-methylated flavanones
Phytoalexins